James Bruce Tomkins,  (born 19 August 1965) is an Australian rower, seven-time World Champion and a three-time Olympic gold medalist. He is Australia's most awarded oarsman, having made appearances at six Olympic games (for three gold and one bronze medal); eleven World Championships (for seven world titles including one in each of the five sweep oar events); four Rowing World Cups (for two titles) and eighteen state representative King's Cup appearances – the Australian blue riband men's VIII event, (for fifteen victories, ten as stroke). Tomkins is one of only five Australian athletes and four rowers worldwide to compete at six Olympics. From 1990 to 1998 he was the stroke of Australia's prominent world class crew – the coxless four known as the Oarsome Foursome.

Club and state rowing
Tomkins took up rowing at Carey Baptist Grammar School. He stroked the Carey First VIII in both of his senior years, 1982 and 1983. His long senior club career was with the Mercantile Rowing Club in Melbourne.

Tomkins was selected in Victorian state representative King's Cup crews contesting the men's Interstate Eight-Oared Championship at the Australian Rowing Championships on eighteen occasions from 1985 to 2004. Tomkins was in winning Victorian King's Cup crews on fifteen occasions, for ten of which he was in stroke seat.

Tomkins competed in Mercantile colours in the National Regatta at the Australian Rowing Championships in coxless pairs and in coxed and coxless fours from 1985. He won Australian national titles at those Australian Rowing Championships in 1985, 1987 & 1988 in a 2-; in 1986 & 1987 in a 4+; and in 1988 & 1990 in a 4- with other members of the Oarsome Foursome.

International representative rowing
In 1985, Tomkins first made the Australian national team as stroke of the senior men's eight for the 1985 World Rowing Championships in Hazewinkel Belgium. The Australian eight finished in ninth place. In 1986, the Australian eight stroked by Steve Evans won a gold medal at the 1986 World Rowing Championships in Nottingham, England with Tomkins rowing in the six seat. That same crew rowed to victory at the 1986 Commonwealth Games in Edinburgh, and Tomkins won a Commonwealth Games gold medal. Tomkins also stroked a coxed four to a bronze medal at those same games.

At the World Championships in Copenhagen 1987 Tomkins was in the six seat when the men's VIII finished in fourth place  and at the 1988 Summer Olympics, the Australian eight finished fourth with Tomkins again rowing at six.

In 1990 with his Mercantile clubmates Samuel Patten & Mike McKay and Nick Green from the Melbourne University Boat Club, Tomkins began racing an Australian representative coxless four.  Their success was immediate.  They won the 1990 and 1991 World Championships. After Andrew Cooper replaced Samuel Patten, they followed up with a gold medal at the 1992 Summer Olympics in Barcelona. The crew's success gained them the nickname Oarsome Foursome and lifted the profile of rowing in Australia. The crew repeated its gold medal performance at the 1996 Summer Olympics, this time with Drew Ginn replacing Andrew Cooper.

At the 1998 World Championships, the Oarsome Foursome raced and won the men's coxed four world title with Brett Hayman in the stern. Tomkins, Green and Hayman also took the world title at that same regatta as a coxed pair. In 1999, the boat would go on to try out, but lose the 1999 Australian selection trials in a coxless four.  Tomkins and Drew Ginn decided to switch to a coxless pair and won the 1999 World Championship. This win established Tomkins as the first man to win a gold medal at World Championships in each of the five sweep rowing events.

Tomkins and Ginn had planned to row the pair at the 2000 Summer Olympics in Sydney, but while in Europe preparing for the games, a severe back injury requiring surgery sidelined Ginn.  On short notice, Tomkins teamed with team alternate Matthew Long, (who had to switch from stroke side to bow side) and they raced a surprising third at the Lucerne World Cup race.  Tomkins and Long were selected to represent Australia, and at the Olympics, they finished third behind France and the United States, just 1.3 seconds out of first place.

Returning to a coxless pair in 2002, Ginn and Tomkins beat the heavily favoured British crew of Matthew Pinsent and James Cracknell in a world cup race before finishing a close fourth at the 2002 World Championships.   In 2003, Ginn and Tomkins reversed the prior years result winning the 2003 World Championship, with Pinsent and Cracknell placing fourth. In 2004, Pinsent and Cracknell moved to the coxless four to better their chances for a medal.  Ginn and Tomkins would go on to win the coxless pair at the 2004 Summer Olympics, leading at every mark, beating Croatia by 2 seconds, with South Africa claiming the bronze.

Tomkins was selected in the men's eight for the 2007 World Rowing Championships in Munich, placing a disappointing 4th.  He competed in his sixth Olympic Games at Beijing following the disqualification of the Russian Federation boat as a result of a doping scandal. Tomkins was the Australian flag bearer at the Opening Ceremony.  Tomkins and his crew finished last in the final of the men's eight and 6th overall at the Beijing Games.

He is one of four athletes to compete in rowing at six Olympics, along with Romanian Elisabeta Oleniuc Lipă in 2004, Canadian cox Lesley Thompson, and Estonian Jüri Jaanson.

Accolades
James Tomkins was announced as the 2008 Victorian Father of the Year by the Father's Day Council of Victoria Inc.

In 2010 he was inducted as a member of the Rowing Victoria Hall of Fame and that same year the International Rowing Federation awarded Tomkins the Thomas Keller Medal for his outstanding international rowing career. It is the sport's highest honor and is awarded within five years of the athlete's retirement, acknowledging an exceptional career and exemplary sportsmanship.

In 2012 he was inducted into the Sport Australia Hall of Fame and was elected to the IOC Athletes' Commission. He will serve as an IOC member for eight years.

Tomkins also helped to build the Carey/Yarra Yarra Boat Sheds on the Yarra River in Melbourne. There is an eight named after him in Carey boatshed.

Achievements
2008 Beijing Olympics Australian Flag Bearer
Olympic Medals: 3 Gold, 1 Bronze
World Championship Medals: 7 Gold
Commonwealth Games Medals: 1 Gold, 1 Bronze
King's Cup: 15 Championships
FISA World Cups: 2 Gold
FISA Crew of the Year: 2003, Coxless Pair
Thomas Keller Medal: 2010

Olympic Games
2008 – 6th, Eight
2004 – Gold, Coxless Pair (with Drew Ginn)
2000 – Bronze, Coxless Pair (with Matthew Long)
1996 – Gold, Coxless Four (with Nick Green, Drew Ginn, Mike McKay)
1992 – Gold, Coxless Four (with Nick Green, Andrew Cooper, Mike McKay)
1988 – 5th, Eight

World championships
2007 – 7th, Eight
2003 – Gold, Coxless Pair (with Drew Ginn)
2002 – 4th, Coxless Pair (with Drew Ginn)
1999 – Gold, Coxless Pair (with Drew Ginn)
1998 – Gold, Coxed Four (with Nick Green, Mike McKay, Drew Ginn and Brett Hayman
1998 – Gold, Coxed Pair (with Nick Green and Brett Hayman
1995 – 5th, Coxless Four (with Nick Green, Drew Ginn, Mike McKay)
1991 – Gold, Coxless Four (with Nick Green, Samuel Patten, Mike McKay)
1990 – Gold, Coxless Four (with Nick Green, Samuel Patten, Mike McKay)
1987 – 4th, Eight
1986 – Gold, Eight
1985 – 9th, Eight

FISA World Cups
2008 – 4th, Eight, World Cup II
2008 – 1st, Eight, World Cup I
2007 – 6th, Eight, World Cup III
2007 – 10th, Eight, World Cup II
2002 – 1st, Coxless Pair, World Cup II

The Kings Cup
2008– 2nd, New South Wales (1st)
2007– 1st
2004– 2nd, New South Wales (1st)
2003– 1st
2002– 1st
2000– 1st
1999– 2nd, Western Australia (1st)
1998– 1st
1996– 1st
1995– 1st
1994– 1st
1992– 1st
1991– 1st
1990– 1st
1988– 1st
1987– 1st
1986– 1st
1984– 1st

Commonwealth Games
1986 – Gold, Eight. Bronze, Coxed Four (with James Galloway, Andrew Cooper, Mike McKay and Dale Caterson (cox)).

See also
List of athletes with the most appearances at Olympic Games

References

External links

1965 births
Australian male rowers
Olympic rowers of Australia
Rowers at the 1992 Summer Olympics
Rowers at the 1996 Summer Olympics
Rowers at the 2000 Summer Olympics
Rowers at the 2004 Summer Olympics
Rowers at the 2008 Summer Olympics
People educated at Carey Baptist Grammar School
Olympic gold medalists for Australia
Olympic bronze medalists for Australia
RMIT University alumni
Olympic medalists in rowing
Australian International Olympic Committee members
Medalists at the 2004 Summer Olympics
Recipients of the Medal of the Order of Australia
Sport Australia Hall of Fame inductees
Rowers from Sydney
Living people
Rowers at the 1988 Summer Olympics
Medalists at the 2000 Summer Olympics
Medalists at the 1996 Summer Olympics
Medalists at the 1992 Summer Olympics
International Olympic Committee members
Commonwealth Games medallists in rowing
Commonwealth Games gold medallists for Australia
Commonwealth Games bronze medallists for Australia
World Rowing Championships medalists for Australia
Thomas Keller Medal recipients
Rowers at the 1986 Commonwealth Games
Medallists at the 1986 Commonwealth Games